Matt Puccia is a former crew chief. He last worked for Roush Fenway Racing as the crew chief for the No. 6 Ford Fusion driven by Trevor Bayne and Matt Kenseth in the Monster Energy NASCAR Cup Series. He joined the team mid-season in 2011, having previously served as crew chief in the Nationwide Series for Paul Menard, and then with the team's research and development organization. He was named the Sprint Cup Series' 2012 Crew Chief of the Year.

References

External links 
 

Living people
Year of birth missing (living people)
Sportspeople from Watertown, New York
NASCAR crew chiefs